Welcome to Waikiki is a 2018 youth South Korean television series starring Kim Jung-hyun, Lee Yi-kyung, and Son Seung-won. It aired from February 5 to April 17, 2018 on JTBC's Mondays and Tuesdays at 23:00 (KST) time slot.

On June 6, 2018, it was renewed for a second season, which premiered on March 25, 2019.

Synopsis
Three very different young men – Dong Goo (Kim Jung Hyun), who dreams of becoming a film director, Joon Ki (Lee Yi Kyung), an eccentric actor who performs to make a living, and Doo Shik (Son Seung Won), a freelance writer who fiddles around doing nothing most of the time, open a guest house named “Waikiki” in Itaewon, where many foreigners come to stay. Although they have no clue how to run it, they’re eager to earn money to pay for the production of their upcoming film. They are joined by Dong Goo’s younger sister, Seo Jin (go Won Hee), who actually manages the household in Waikiki, single mother Yoon Ah (Jung In Sun), who has made an unexpected entrance at the guest house with her baby, and Dong Goo’s ex-girlfriend Soo Ah (Lee Joo Woo).

Cast

Main
 Kim Jung-hyun as Kang Dong-gu
 A short-tempered young man that resembles an "icon of misfortune" who dreams of becoming a movie director. Picking himself up after a painful breakup, he starts working again. He falls for Yoon-ah. 
 Lee Yi-kyung as Lee Joon-ki
 The son of an A-list actor who wants to follow the footsteps of his father but is stuck in minor roles. He is very determined to make it on his own and would go to great lengths in order to land better roles. He is allergic to walnut. He eventually sees Seo-jin as a woman. 
 Son Seung-won as Bong Doo-sik
 A kind-hearted but timid freelance writer who barely receives work. He currently works in a convenience store and whiles his time away writing a web story. 
 Jung In-sun as Han Yoon-ah
 A single mother who ends up staying in the guesthouse with her daughter Sol in exchange for helping out. She makes the other residents uncomfortable with her quirky behavior and is prone to forgetting things and causing accidents. She initially wanted to be a rapper but later on studied in earnest to be a pastry chef. Afraid of trusting men again, she eventually agrees to be Dong-gu's girlfriend. 
 Ko Won-hee as Kang Seo-jin
 Dong-gu's sister who wants to be a journalist but had difficulty landing a job. Joon-ki calls her Chewbacca, later on shortened to Bacca. Her facial hair is a source of embarrassment and she has to shave it regularly. She falls for and starts a relationship with Joon-ki in but hides it from her disapproving brother.
 Lee Joo-woo as Min Soo-ah
 Dong-gu's ex-girlfriend, a famous model, who suddenly broke up with him. She ends up staying in the guesthouse when her new boyfriend ran away with all her money. She tries to make a comeback with Doo-sik's help.

Supporting
 Kang Kyung-joon as Song Hyun-joon (Ep. 9–16)
 Pastry chef, owner of bakery, instructor in Yoon-ah's school. In love with Yoon-ah.
 Lee Jung-hyuk as Kim Woo-sung	
 Ryu Hye-rin as Jin-joo
 Lee Ji-ha as Ji-soo's mother
 Kim Ji-sung as Ah-young

Special appearances
 Park Sung-woong as Park Sung-woong, actor    (Ep. 1)
 Seol Jung-hwan as Lee Yoon-suk, Soo-ah's boyfriend (con artist) (Ep. 1, 2, 10 & 11)
 Han Ji-sang as Tae Hyun, Seo-jin's college senior and first boyfriend (Ep. 2 & 3)
 Go Min-si as Lee Min-ah, Doo-sik's co-worker (Ep. 3)
 Choi Ri as Ji-min, Joon-ki's waxer (Ep. 3)
 Kim Young-ok as Jang-gun's grandma (Ep. 4)
 Lee Deok-hwa as Lee Deok-hwa, actor, father of Joon-ki (Ep. 4)
 Jason Scott Nelson as Hostel Guest (Ep. 4)
 Kim Seo-hyung as Kim Hee-Ja, actress (Ep. 4)
 Jo Woo-ri as Sun-woo, daughter of Doo-sik's boss (Ep. 5)
 Jin Ye-sol as Kwon Hye-jin, script writer who wanted to date Joon-ki (Ep. 5)
 Jeon Soo-kyeong as owner of Waikiki Guesthouse (Ep. 6)
 Wheesung as Wheesung, singer at wedding (Ep. 6)
 Han Bo-bae as Yoon Mal-geum/Cherry, Doo-sik's first love, adult's movies' actress (Ep. 7–9)
 Kang Kyun-sung as Kang Kyun-sung, actor playing masked octopus (Ep. 10)
 Shin Seung-hwan as Min Soo-bong, Soo-ah's brother, UFC fighter (Ep. 11)
 Tae In-ho as Kim Jae-woo, a producer at JBC (Ep. 11-12)
 Kim Byung-se as Park Chang-ho, announcer (Ep. 12)
 Yoon Se-ah as Dong-gu's university club senior (Ep. 12)
 Jung Soo-young as Department store person
 Kim Ki-hyeon as Min Ki-young, actor (Ep. 13)
 Seo Yu-ri as Radio DJ Seo Yu-ri (Ep. 13)
 Kang Hong-seok as Hong-suk (Ep. 13)
 Shin Hyun-soo as Philip, model (Ep. 16)
 Lee Ha-yool as Seo Jin-woo, actor (Ep. 16)
 HALO as ASTAR, an idol group (Ep. 18)
 Kim Kiri as MC Dacopy, rapper (Ep. 19)
 Kim Jin-woo as Sol's father (Ep. 20)
 Kim Ho-chang as Lee Sang Heon (Ep. 6)

Production
 Ryu Hwa-young was first offered a major role, but declined.
 The first script reading of the cast was held on December 18, 2017 at JTBC building in Sangam-dong.
 On March 6, JTBC extended the show for four more episodes and aired two commentary specials in preparation for the extension.

Original soundtrack

Part 1

Part 2

Part 3

Part 4

Part 5

Viewership

Remake
A Vietnamese remake titled  aired in 2020 on VTV3.

References

External links
  
  on JTBC Worldwide
 
 

Korean-language television shows
JTBC television dramas
2018 South Korean television series debuts
2018 South Korean television series endings
South Korean comedy television series
Television series by C-JeS Entertainment
Television series by Drama House